Hackney House, also known as Hackney Place, is a historic home located at Morgantown, Monongalia County, West Virginia. The original section was built in 1892, and is a square, -story balloon frame structure with a Queen Anne style entrance porch.  A two-story, square addition was added shortly after the original construction.  It sits on a cut sandstone foundation.

It was listed on the National Register of Historic Places in 1999. It is located in the Greenmont Historic District, listed in 2005.

References

Houses on the National Register of Historic Places in West Virginia
Queen Anne architecture in West Virginia
Houses completed in 1892
Houses in Morgantown, West Virginia
National Register of Historic Places in Monongalia County, West Virginia